Johannes "Jan" Dam (24 November 1905 – 19 December 1985) was a Dutch boxer who competed in the 1924 Summer Olympics. He was born and died in Rotterdam. In 1924 he was eliminated in the second round of the welterweight class after losing his fight to Roy Ingram.

References

1905 births
1985 deaths
Welterweight boxers
Olympic boxers of the Netherlands
Boxers at the 1924 Summer Olympics
Boxers from Rotterdam
Dutch male boxers